Extension is the third album by American saxophonist George Braith recorded in 1964 and released on the Blue Note label.

Reception
The Allmusic review by Stephen Thomas Erlewine awarded the album 4½ stars and stated "George Braith turned in his strongest record with Extension. Largely freed from the restraints of the dueling horns, Braith is able to explore the outer reaches of his music. He still remains grounded in soul-jazz -- any guitar-organ combo is bound to have soul-jazz roots -- but he pushes the music toward adventurous hard bop, often with rewarding results".

Track listing
All compositions by George Braith, except where noted.
 "Nut City" - 5:57
 "Ethlyn's Love" - 7:22
 "Out Here" - 6:58
 "Extension" - 6:39
 "Sweetville" - 6:03
 "Ev'ry Time We Say Goodbye" (Porter) - 4:30

Personnel
George Braith - soprano saxophone, tenor saxophone, alto saxophone
Billy Gardner - organ
Grant Green - guitar
Clarence Johnston - drums

References 

Blue Note Records albums
George Braith albums
1964 albums
Albums recorded at Van Gelder Studio
Albums produced by Alfred Lion